Wallace Clark (1926–2011) was a British sailor, author and businessman from Northern Ireland.

Wallace Clark can also refer to  
 Wallace H. Clark Jr. (1924–1997), pathologist, cancer researcher
 Henry Wallace Clark (1880–1948), American consulting engineer
 Wallace "Wally" Clark (1896–1975), English professional footballer

See also 
 Wally Clark (disambiguation)
 Walter Clarke (disambiguation)